South Seas Film & Television School is a higher education institution centered on the visual arts based in Auckland, New Zealand. They offer courses for full-time diplomas in Film & TV, Photography and On Screen Acting. They also offer introductory courses for Introduction to Film & TV Production, Introduction to Photography and Introduction to On Screen Acting.

In May 2019, South Seas Film and Television School was rebranded under the new name “Yoobee Colleges - South Seas Film School Campus”.

Notable alumni
Alex Gilbert - adoption advocate
Oriini Kaipara - Broadcaster, journalist and Māori translator
Jabez Olssen - Editor
Julia Parnell - Producer
Gwendoline Taylor - Actress
David Schurmann - filmmaker
Jazz Thornton - mental health activist, author, filmmaker
Pere Wihongi - musician, choreographer, voice actor

References

Education in Auckland
Film schools in New Zealand